Caenopsis is a genus of beetles belonging to the family Curculionidae.

The species of this genus are found in Western Europe.

Species:

Caenopsis andalusiensis 
Caenopsis assmanni 
Caenopsis bermejaensis 
Caenopsis breviscapus 
Caenopsis brevisetis 
Caenopsis crestellinensis 
Caenopsis fissirostris 
Caenopsis formaneki 
Caenopsis gracilicornis 
Caenopsis larraldi 
Caenopsis longirostris 
Caenopsis peyerimhoffi 
Caenopsis reichei 
Caenopsis stuebeni 
Caenopsis waltoni 
Caenopsis zerchei

References

Curculionidae